Shrink Rap is a British television series hosted by clinical psychologist Dr Pamela Stephenson in which she interviews various celebrities using psychotherapeutic techniques. The show focuses on relating various childhood experiences and traumas to the adult difficulties of the celebrities. While quasi-therapeutic in approach, the interviewees were briefed that the conversations were interviews and not strictly therapy.

The programme premièred on More4 on 2 April 2007 and was aired in Australia on ABC2 in 2008.

Episodes

Series 1

Special

Series 2

Series 3

References

External links

2007 British television series debuts
2010 British television series endings
British television talk shows
Channel 4 original programming